Guled Casowe ((May 15, 1978, in Jijiga eastern Ethiopia, Ogaden) is a Somali political leader.

Youth
Guled Casowe, who belonged to the Ogaden sub-clan of the Darod clan family, was born in 1978 in the valley of Jijiga. His birth date marked with the defeat of the Somali army in the Ethio-Somali war. Guled and his family fled to Somalia and resided in Mogadisho 

Guled  thus grew up in Mogadisho. Young Guled's hero was his maternal aunt. In addition to being an intelgient child, by the age of eleven, Guled had learned the entire Qur'an by heart (he was a hafiz), and displayed all the qualities of a promising leader. He continued his religious and secular education.

Guled Casowe achieved his primary education in Mogadisho, where he attended Mohamoud Harbi Primary & Junior School and Central Mogadisho Secondary School. After the downfall of Somali Dictator Mohamed Siad Barre and the starting of the Somali Civil War. Guled returned his homeland and resettled in Jijiga.

Educational Achievement
Guled Casowe attended Ethiopian Civil Service College, where he obtained LLB Degree with distinction. He latter achieved his master's degree from Greenwich University. He attended Masters of Transformational Leadership and Change Agent Leader at International Leadership Institute in 2009.

Political and Leadership Role
Guled worked in various governmental agencies and Bureaux. In 2001-2003, He first worked Somali State Justice and General Persecution Bureau as Legal Expert. In 2003-2004, he was appointed as the Legal Adviser of the Somali Regional State Council of People's Representative. In 2005, he was nominated as the presiding Judge of the Korahe Zonal Court in Kebri Dahar. After a year in Korahe, he was promoted as chairing judge at the Cassation Bench in the Somali Regional State Supreme Court in Jijiga. At the end of 2009, Guled Casowe was appointed to Minister of Information, Culture & Tourism in Somali Regional State.

Achievement
During the time Guled Casowe was Information Minister, he achieved a lot more than any person in Somali Regional State history 
. He established the first independent FM radio and Regional TV network. On his effort to promote Somali Culture and history, he began rebuilding the Castle of Mohammed Abdullah Hassan. In the middle of 2009, The Somali Regional State administration expressed that they will exhume the remains of Mohammed Abdullah Hassan and rebury him in his old castle at Imme.  Although, most individuals who knew the exact location of the Mohammed Abdullah Hassan's tomb are dead for a long time now, the Regional Information Minister Mr. Guled Casowe told on VOA Somali Section interview, that very few, senile individuals who can reveal the details of the Hassan's grave may be alive, making the region's search efforts attainable. Guled Casowe promoted the use of DNA samples to determine whether the remains they found in grave yard at Gindhir.

In 2019, he founded Geedka Nabada (Peace Tree) to provide authentic news and analysis from Horn of Africa. This platform promotes the peace, culture and the good image of Somali State.

Notes

References
VOA Somali Service, Sayid Maxamed halkuu ku aasan yahay?, Indepth Interview With Somali Regional State Information Minister, Mr Guled Asowe, March 24, 2009 

21st-century Ethiopian politicians
Ethnic Somali people
1978 births
Living people
People from Jijiga
Ogaden (clan)
Ethiopian people of Somali descent